Corro da te is a 2022 Italian comedy film directed by Riccardo Milani.

It is a remake of the 2018 French film Rolling to You (Tout le monde debout).

Distribution 
The film was released in cinemas starting March 17, 2022. The first trailer is released on January 11, 2022.

Cast

References

External links

2022 films
2020s Italian-language films
2022 comedy films
Italian remakes of French films
Italian comedy films
Films directed by Riccardo Milani
2020s Italian films